Tambaram - Sengottai Antyodaya Express is a superfast express train of the Indian Railways connecting  in Chengalpet district with  in Tenkasi district of Tamil Nadu. It was planned to be operated daily with 16189/16190 train numbers, later decision was reverted.

Coach composition 

The train has 16 unreserved  coaches (UR) and 2 EOG. These coaches feature a LED screen display to show information about stations, train speed etc. Vending machines for tea, coffee and milk, Bio toilets in compartments as well as CCTV cameras as well as facility for potable drinking water and mobile charging points and toilet occupancy indicators.

Service

This train was permanently cancelled after 15 days of trial run (with numbers of 06023/24 and ran via vriddhachalam junction due to ongoing interlock works at thanjavur junction) and the single rake which was allocated for this route was re-allocated for new antyodya train service between Kochuveli Mangalore Junction Antyodya Express which was inaugurated on 09/06/2018. Due to raise of demand, now railways is planning to operate a new triweekly express between Tambaram to Sengottai via Ambasamudram, Aruppukottai, Pattukottai as a compensation for this cancelled Antyodya Express.

See also 

 Antyodaya Express
 Tambaram railway station
 Sengottai railway station

References 

Antyodaya Express trains
Rail transport in Tamil Nadu